Kirk Windstein (born April 14, 1965) is an American musician. He is the frontman, vocalist, rhythm guitarist, and sole constant member of the sludge metal band Crowbar. He is also a founding member of the heavy metal supergroup Down, playing guitar with them from 1991 to 2013 and later rejoining the band in 2020. In 2005, Windstein formed Kingdom of Sorrow with Jamey Jasta of Hatebreed. Their debut album was released in 2008. Windstein began his musical career in 1985 as a guitarist for a cover band called Victorian Blitz, and in 1988 joined a hardcore punk band called Shell Shock as a vocalist and guitarist.

Life and career

Victorian Blitz
Windstein played guitar for the cover band Victorian Blitz in 1985. Other members included Sid Montz, with whom Windstein would play again in Crowbar, Valüme Nob, Kevin Noonan, and bassist Danny Theriot.

Shell Shock
Having left Victorian Blitz, Windstein joined the New Orleans' hardcore punk band Shell Shock as their guitarist and vocalist. With Windstein in the band they began to play more of a crossover thrash style rather than straightforward hardcore punk, as it better suited Windstein's vocal style and a two-guitarists line-up. After finishing the recording of a new album called No Tomorrow, the band's guitarist Mike Hatch committed suicide. Kevin Noonan replaced Hatch for the final Shell Shock show in 1988, and the band became what is now Crowbar.

Crowbar
After the collapse of Shell Shock in 1988 due to the suicide of Hatch, the band enlisted Kevin Noonan and carried on as Aftershock, which played a mixture of hardcore punk and doom metal. Under that name, they released a demo in mid-1989, but then renamed themselves Wrequiem when bassist Mike Savoie (who would later direct music videos for Crowbar, Down, and Pantera) left the band and was replaced by Todd Strange. In 1990, they renamed themselves The Slugs, and after a demo in mid-1990, the band collapsed. Windstein considered becoming the guitarist for Exhorder. But he and Strange reformed the band, with Craig Nunenmacher as the drummer, and Kevin Noonan on guitar. The band renamed themselves to Crowbar in mid-1991.

Crowbar was originally signed by Mark Nawara to Pavement Music and released their debut album Obedience thru Suffering in 1991. Windstein's childhood friend Phil Anselmo (who at the time was with Pantera) produced their next effort, a self-titled album released in 1993. The album went on to achieve international success with songs such as "All I Had (I Gave)", "Existence Is Punishment", and a cover of Led Zeppelin's "No Quarter". MTV's Headbangers Ball began to play the music video for "Existence Is Punishment", which was also featured on Beavis and Butt-Head. Following that success, the band toured with Pantera. Together, they partied heavily, and footage of these events appears on Pantera's third home video and Crowbar's "Like Broken" video, in which Windstein dressed up as Hulk. In 2001, Crowbar went on hiatus, because Windstein concentrated on other bands. Upon Windstein's return, Crowbar released Lifesblood for the Downtrodden in 2005, and two years later released a live DVD called Live: With Full Force. The band released Sever the Wicked Hand in 2011, Symmetry in Black in 2014, The Serpent Only Lies in 2016, and their latest, Zero and Below, in March 2022.

Down

Down released their debut album NOLA via Elektra Records in 1995 with Windstein on guitar and bass, Anselmo on vocals, Pepper Keenan on guitar, and Jimmy Bower (Crowbar, Superjoint Ritual, and Eyehategod) on drums. The band played a 13-show tour with Todd Strange on bass, and the album was certified gold by the RIAA. Following the tour, each member returned to their respective bands. Crowbar recorded three albums before Down reunited to release Down II: A Bustle in Your Hedgerow in 2002. Following the release, Down toured on the second stage at Ozzfest, and then continued to tour on the "An Evening With... Down" tour. Afterward, both Windstein and Keenan returned to their main bands, thereby allowing Windstein to record Crowbar's Lifesblood for the Downtrodden with Rex Brown on bass, Craig Nunenmacher (Black Label Society and original Crowbar member) on drums and Down producer Warren Riker in early 2005. In 2007, Down released the album Down III: Over the Under. They released an EP titled Down IV – Part I in September 2012. In late 2013, Windstein announced that he is leaving Down to concentrate on Crowbar 'full-time', as the band has its 25 anniversary in 2014. In 2020, Windstein rejoined Down.

Kingdom of Sorrow
In 2005, Windstein teamed up with vocalist Jamey Jasta of Hatebreed to form a new side venture called Kingdom of Sorrow. The band's self-titled debut album was released on February 19, 2008 through Relapse Records. It debuted at No. 131 on the US Billboard charts and sold 6,000 records in its first week of release. The album was recorded at Planet Z with producer Zeuss, known for his work with Shadows Fall and many others.

Solo work
In January 2020, Windstein released his first solo album, Dream in Motion.

Personal life
Windstein is married and has a daughter. He is a Christian.

Equipment

Guitar
Ibanez DT520 Destroyer (currently with Crowbar)
ESP Viper (Black)
ESP Viper Baritone
ESP Viper Custom (Red)
ESP Eclipse Ambery Cherry Sunburst 
Gibson SG VooDoo (2005 with Crowbar)
Gibson SG Standard Black (2005 with Crowbar)
Gibson SG Gothic (Down 2002, Crowbar 2005, Kingdom of Sorrow 2008)
Fender Stratocaster White (2009 Tour with Down)
ESP Viper Custom Purple Le Fleur-de-lis (2010 Crowbar)
Gibson Explorer White (Down)
Solar E1.6 Jensen

Amplification and effects
Randall RG100ES (Crowbar, used from 1988–2013)
Randall RG3003 (Crowbar, used since 2013)
Randall Cyclone (Crowbar, used briefly around 2000–2001)
Dean Dime D-100 (Crowbar, used briefly during 2010–2011)
Orange Thunderverb 50 (he and Pepper Keenan are both endorsers since 2010)
Marshall Amplification
Marshall JCM800 2203X 100W Head (Down)
Orange Rockerverb 100 (Down)
Orange Crush Pro 120 Head (Crowbar)
Marshall 1960B straight front 300W 4x12 cabinets that use celestion V30speakers
Mesa/Boogie Standard 4x12 cabinets with Celestion V30 speakers (Crowbar)
Orange PPC 412 4x12 cabinet with Celestion V30 speakers
Maxon Effects Pedals
Boss Metal Zone MT-2 pedal (Used for boost with Crowbar, EQ all at noon, level cranked, drive at 0)

Discography

Crowbar

Down

Kingdom of Sorrow

Solo

Music videos
 1991: Crowbar – "Subversion"
 1993: Crowbar – "All I Had (I Gave)"
 1993: Crowbar – "Existence Is Punishment"
 1994: Down – "Stone the Crow"
 1995: Crowbar – "The Only Factor
 1996: Crowbar – "Broken Glass"
 1997: Crowbar – "Like Broken" (full-length home video)
 1997: Pantera – "3 Watch It Go" (full-length home video) (Windstein as The Incredible Hulk)
 2000: Crowbar – "I Feel the Burning Sun"
 2002: Down – "Ghosts along the Mississippi"
 2005: Crowbar – "Dead Sun" (filmed in Miami, Florida, around August 2004 and directed by John-Martin Vogel and Robert Lisman)
 2005: Crowbar – "Lasting Dose"
 2005: Crowbar – "Slave No More" (filmed in Miami, Florida, on June 21, 2005, and directed by John-Martin Vogel)
 2007: Crowbar – "Live: With Full Force" (full-length DVD)
 2007: Down – "On March the Saints"
 2008: Kingdom of Sorrow – "Lead into Demise"
 2008: Kingdom of Sorrow – "Lead the Ghosts Astray"
 2011: Crowbar – "Cemetery Angels"
 2012: Down – "Witchtripper"
 2014: Crowbar – "Walk with Knowledge Wisely"
 2014: Crowbar – "Symmetry in White"
 2016: Crowbar – "Falling While Rising"
 2019: Kirk Windstein – "Dream in Motion"
 2021: Crowbar - "Chemical Godz"
 2022: Crowbar - "Bleeding From Every Hole"

References

External links

Crowbar official webpage
Down official webpage
Valume Nob official webpage
Kirk Windstein interview (Nov. 2007)

1965 births
American Christians
American heavy metal guitarists
American heavy metal singers
American male guitarists
American male singer-songwriters
American rock songwriters
Guitarists from Louisiana
Living people
Musicians from New Orleans
Rhythm guitarists
Singer-songwriters from Louisiana
20th-century American guitarists
Crowbar (American band) members
Down (band) members
Kingdom of Sorrow members
American baritones